The Taipei Economic and Cultural Office in Spain; (Spanish: Oficina Económica y Cultural de Taipei en España) represents the interests of Taiwan in Spain in the absence of formal diplomatic relations, functioning as a de facto embassy. Its counterpart in Taiwan is the Spanish Chamber of Commerce in Taipei.

The Office is headed by a Representative, currently Simon Ko.

History
The office was established as the Centro Sun Yat-sen in 1973. Previously, Spain recognised Taiwan as the Republic of China, which was represented by an embassy in Madrid. There were close relations between the governments of Francisco Franco and Chiang Kai-shek, both of which were anti-communist.  However, diplomatic relations were severed in 1973 when Spain recognised the People's Republic of China.

Representatives
 Hou Ching-shan (2010–2015)
 Simon Ko (2016–2018)
 José María Liu (2018–)

See also
 List of diplomatic missions of Taiwan
 List of diplomatic missions in Spain

References

External links
 Oficina Económica y Cultural de Taipei en España 

 

Spain
Taiwan
1973 establishments in Spain
Organizations established in 1973
Spain–Taiwan relations